

Ward results

References

2011 English local elections
2011
21st century in Tyne and Wear